Ranković (Cyrillic script: Ранковић) is a Serbian patronymic surname derived from a masculine given name Ranko. Notable people with the surname include:

Aleksandar Leka Ranković (1909–1983), leading Yugoslav Communist of Serbian origin
Ljubiša Ranković (born 1973), former Serbian footballer
Svetolik Ranković (1863–1899), Serbian writer
Aleksandar Ranković (born 1978), Serbian footballer
Zoran Ranković, Yugoslav footballer

Serbian surnames
Patronymic surnames